Sir John de Sotheron (died after 1398) was an English landowner, lawyer and judge, who served briefly as Lord Chief Justice of Ireland.

He was the son of Thomas de Sotheron or de Sotherne, Lord of the Manor of Great Mitton in Lancashire, and grandson of Sir Robert de Sotheron; Mitton had passed by inheritance to the de Sotherons from the de Mitton family. He inherited his father's lands in about 1369; at the time he was involved in a dispute with nearby Cockersand Abbey over the advowson (i.e. the right to select a candidate for parish priest) of Mitton Church. In February 1368 he was the defendant in a claim for a debt of 40 shillings brought against him by William de Mirfeld. He is known to have been acting as an attorney at this time.

In 1377 he was pardoned for killing John de Holden. He lived in a violent age, where cases of manslaughter and even murder among the ruling class were not uncommon, and a royal pardon was easy enough to obtain; nor would a criminal record necessarily hinder one's career, as de Sotheron's own later life shows.

In 1384 he was sent to Ireland as Chief Justice of the Irish Common Pleas, but he took up office as Lord Chief Justice instead. He served for one year, during which there is a record in the Patent  Rolls of him as one of three senior judges who acted for the  Lord Lieutenant of Ireland  in his absence. He returned to England after a year, then came back to Ireland in the summer of 1386, as a legal adviser to Sir John Stanley, the Lord Lieutenant of Ireland, and was given letters of protection in June for the journey. He remained in Ireland for several years; he lived then at Dangan, County Meath. Ball states that his wife Joanna was kidnapped from Dangan Castle in 1392, but gives no further details of the episode.

He returned to England sometime after 1392, was knighted, and retired to his estates in Lancashire.

He married Joanna, daughter of Sir Simon Cusack, who was summoned to the so-called Good Parliament of 1376 as Baron Culmullen, and had at least two surviving children, Christopher and Isabella, who married Walter Hawksworth of Hawksworth, Yorkshire. He was still living in 1397/8, when he and his eldest son and heir Christopher were in dispute with Roger White and others as to the ownership of lands at Great Mitton. The estate passed to Christopher, whose descendants remained there for several generations. The family name was later spelt Sherburne.

References

People from Ribble Valley (district)
Lords chief justice of Ireland
14th-century English people
Knights Bachelor